John Howell (17 June 1943 – 10 November 2010) was a New Zealand cricketer. He played in 34 first-class and 5 List A matches for Central Districts from 1966 to 1973.

See also
 List of Central Districts representative cricketers

References

External links
 

1943 births
2010 deaths
New Zealand cricketers
Central Districts cricketers
People from Waipawa
Sportspeople from the Hawke's Bay Region